The Tulane Green Wave football team represents the Tulane University in American football.

Seasons list

Notes

References 

Tulane Green Wave

Tulane Green Wave football seasons